Muhammad X (1415–1454) was the eighteenth Nasrid dynasty ruler of the Emirate of Granada in Al Andalus, Islamic Moorish Spain.

References 
Islamic Spain 1250 to 1500 by Leonard Patrick Harvey; University of Chicago Press, 1992

Sultans of Granada
15th-century monarchs in Europe
1415 births
1454 deaths
15th century in Al-Andalus
15th-century Arabs